David Wybon (19 November 1904 – 11 September 1995) was a Belgian racing cyclist. He rode in the 1928 Tour de France.

References

1904 births
1995 deaths
Belgian male cyclists
Place of birth missing